Lamy is a census-designated place (CDP) in Santa Fe County, New Mexico, United States,  south of the city of Santa Fe. The community was named for Archbishop Jean-Baptiste Lamy, and lies within the Bishop John Lamy Spanish Land Grant, which dates back to the eighteenth century.

Lamy is part of the Santa Fe, New Mexico, Metropolitan Statistical Area. The population was 218 at the 2010 census. The former Atchison, Topeka, and Santa Fe Railroad (ATSF), now the Burlington Northern Santa Fe (BNSF), passes through Lamy. This railroad, usually called just the "Santa Fe," was originally planned to run from Atchison, Kansas, on the Missouri River, to Santa Fe, the capital city of New Mexico, and then points west. However, as the tracks progressed west into New Mexico, the civil engineers in charge realized that the hills surrounding Santa Fe made this impractical. Hence, they built the railway line though Lamy, instead. Later on, a spur line was built from Lamy to Santa Fe, bringing the railroad to Santa Fe at last. In 1896 the Fred Harvey Company built the luxurious El Ortiz Hotel here. Thus Lamy became an important railroad junction. From 1992 to 2014, the spur line was taken over by the Santa Fe Southern Railway, which operated a popular excursion train, using vintage passenger railcars and modern freight cars, between Santa Fe and Lamy.

In 2020, several prominent Santa Fe residents, including novelist George R.R. Martin, created Sky Railway, an excursion train that runs on Santa Fe Southern Railway's route between Lamy and Santa Fe. Sky Railway began operations in December, 2021.

The significance of Lamy as a railroad junction is related in the Oscar-nominated documentary, The Day After Trinity (1980), about the building of the first atomic bomb, and is referred to by instrumental group the California Guitar Trio in a five-part suite Train to Lamy on their second album Invitation (1995).

Geography

Demographics

As of the census of 2000, there were 137 people, 55 households, and 33 families residing in the CDP. The population density was 126.2 people per square mile (48.5/km2). There were 64 housing units at an average density of 59.0 per square mile (22.7/km2). The racial makeup of the CDP was 74.45% White, 2.92% Native American, 18.25% from other races, and 4.38% from two or more races. Hispanic or Latino of any race were 44.53% of the population.

There were 55 households, out of which 40.0% had children under the age of 18 living with them, 49.1% were married couples living together, 10.9% had a female householder with no husband present, and 38.2% were non-families. 29.1% of all households were made up of individuals, and 9.1% had someone living alone who was 65 years of age or older. The average household size was 2.49 and the average family size was 3.18.

In the CDP, the population was spread out, with 27.7% under the age of 18, 10.2% from 18 to 24, 26.3% from 25 to 44, 28.5% from 45 to 64, and 7.3% who were 65 years of age or older. The median age was 34 years. For every 100 females, there were 95.7 males. For every 100 females age 18 and over, there were 98.0 males.

The median income for a household in the CDP was $43,333, and the median income for a family was $27,083. Males had a median income of $25,568 versus $0 for females. The per capita income for the CDP was $16,765. There were 17.5% of families and 20.5% of the population living below the poverty line, including no under eighteens and none of those over 64.

Education
It is within Santa Fe Public Schools.

It is zoned to El Dorado Community School (K-8) in El Dorado. Its high school is Santa Fe High School.

Notable people
 Poet James Thomas Stevens has resided in Lamy.
 Artist Thom Ross resides in Lamy.

Museum
The Lamy Railroad and History Museum, located in the historic "Legal Tender" restaurant building, is dedicated  to preserving local history and heritage, with  emphasis on the railroads and their impact on the area. The museum buildings, formerly the  Pflueger General Merchandise Store (built in 1881) and the attached Annex Saloon (built in 1884), are listed on the National Register of Historic Places. The Legal Tender Saloon and Restaurant re-opened as the Legal Tender at The Lamy Railroad & History Museum in March 2012, after 14 years. The restaurant and museum are run as a non-profit and the waitstaff are volunteers. It is open Thursday through Sunday.

References

External links

 Photos of El Ortiz railroad hotel, Lamy, 1896–1945
 Photo, Lamy in 1997

Census-designated places in Santa Fe County, New Mexico
Census-designated places in New Mexico